Jorgelina Cravero and Stéphanie Foretz Gacon were the defending champions, but both players chose not to participate.

Tímea Babos and Jessica Pegula won the title defeating Gabriela Dabrowski and Marie-Ève Pelletier in the final 6–4, 6–3.

Seeds

Draw

Draw

References
 Main Draw

Challenger Banque Nationale de Saguenay
Challenger de Saguenay